Ansonia guibei is a species of toad in the family Bufonidae. It is endemic to northwestern Sabah in Malaysian Borneo. The specific name guibei honors Jean Guibé, a French zoologist and herpetologist. Common names Mesilau toad and Mesilau stream toad have been coined for it.

Description
The overall appearance is slender. The head is as wide as it is long. The tympanum is distinct. The canthus rostralis is sharp. The fingers are slender with expanded tips but without discs. The toes are extensively webbed. Skin has many warts dorsally and is granular on the sides and the ventrum. Alcohol-preserved specimens are blackish brown above, with light spots forming an indistinct dark pattern. Ventral surfaces are whitish with brown suffusion on the throat and spots on the chest.

The tadpoles are dark brown to black on the upper side.

Habitat and conservation
Breeding takes place in small, clear, rocky-bottomed streams. The tadpoles live in the torrents, clinging to rocks and feeding on lithophytes.

This species was once considered very abundant near Mesilau in the Kinabalu National Park. However, this population was decimated in 2015 by earthquakes and subsequent landslides. It is uncertain whether the species still survives near Mesilau (or elsewhere). If it still persists, it could be threatened by infrastructure development for tourism.

References

guibei
Amphibians of Malaysia
Endemic fauna of Malaysia
Endemic fauna of Borneo
Taxa named by Robert F. Inger
Amphibians described in 1966
Taxonomy articles created by Polbot
Amphibians of Borneo
Fauna of the Borneo montane rain forests